The following events occurred in December 1925:

December 1, 1925 (Tuesday)
The Locarno Treaties were formally signed in London.
European delegates also agreed that troops engaging in the Occupation of the Rhineland would be greatly reduced on January 31, 1926.
The Farmer-Labour Party was founded in Japan and dissolved two hours later upon orders from the government which claimed they had a secret communist agenda.
The Stanley Baldwin government survived a vote of censure condemning a recent wave of arrests of communists on offences under the Incitement to Mutiny Act as a violation of free speech rights. 
France negotiated separate treaties with Poland and Czechoslovakia pledging mutual assistance in the event of an attack by Germany on any of the signatories.
A new general election was held in Bolivia after the May 2 results were annulled. Hernando Siles Reyes was elected President.
Born: Cal McLish, baseball player, in Anadarko, Oklahoma (d. 2010); Martin Rodbell, biochemist and Nobel Prize recipient, in Baltimore, Maryland (d. 1998)

December 2, 1925 (Wednesday)
The first National Hockey League game to ever take place in Pittsburgh was played at the Duquesne Gardens as the hometown Pirates lost to their fellow expansion team the New York Americans, 2 to 1, in overtime.
Born: Julie Harris, actress, in Grosse Point, Michigan (d. 2013)

December 3, 1925 (Thursday)
The Northern Irish Border Agreement was signed between the United Kingdom and Irish Free State delineating the border of Northern Ireland.
The George Gershwin composition "Concerto in F" had its world premiere at Carnegie Hall with Walter Damrosch conducting and Gershwin at piano.
Born: Kim Dae-jung, 8th President of South Korea, on island of Hauido, Korea (d. 2009)

December 4, 1925 (Friday)
The Armenian Orphan Rug was formally gifted to U.S. President Calvin Coolidge in recognition of U.S. humanitarian assistance following the Armenian genocide.
The Italian Chamber of Deputies passed a law allowing the government to regulate rates of industrial production based on the needs of the country.
Born: Lino Lacedelli, mountaineer, in Cortina d'Ampezzo, Italy (d. 2009)

December 5, 1925 (Saturday)
The 13th Grey Cup of Canadian football was played.  The Ottawa Senators beat the Winnipeg Tammany Tigers, 24 to 1.
The city of Medina capitulated to the forces of Ibn Saud without resistance.
Peter Paul Rubens' portrait of Saint Teresa of Ávila was found in Berlin after being hidden for 200 years. 
The heavily sensationalized Kip Rhinelander divorce trial ended with the jury ruling in Mrs. Rhinelander's favour.
Died: Władysław Reymont, 58, Polish writer, Nobel Prize laureate

December 6, 1925 (Sunday)
The Milner-Schialoja Agreement between the United Kingdom and Italy redrew the border between Egypt and Italian Libya, transferring Jaghbub to Italian control.
The Pottsville Maroons defeated the Chicago Cardinals 21-7 to all but officially clinch the National Football League championship with the league's best record.
Born: Shigeko, Princess Teru, eldest daughter of Hirohito, at Akasaka Palace in Tokyo (d. 1961)

December 7, 1925 (Monday)
The legislature of the Philippines sent a petition to the United States Congress demanding independence.

December 8, 1925 (Tuesday)
U.S. President Calvin Coolidge made his third State of the Union address to the Congress, stating that "in the fundamentals of government and business the results demonstrate that we are going in the right direction. The country does not appear to require radical departures from the policies already adopted so much as it needs a further extension of these policies and the improvement of details." 
The comedic stage musical The Cocoanuts, written by Irving Berlin for the Marx Brothers, opened on Broadway.
Born: 
Sammy Davis, Jr., entertainer, in Harlem, New York (d. 1990) 
Hank Thompson, baseball player, in Oklahoma City, Oklahoma (d. 1969)
Died: Marguerite Marsh, 37, American film actress

December 9, 1925 (Wednesday)
The Swinton Lions defeated the Wigan Warriors 15-11 to win rugby's Lancashire Cup.
Born: Atif Yilmaz, filmmaker, in Mersin, Turkey (d. 2006)
Died: Pablo Iglesias, 75, co-founder of the Spanish Socialist Workers Party

December 10, 1925 (Thursday)
The Nobel Prizes for 1925 were awarded in Oslo. The honourees consisted of James Franck and Gustav Hertz (award for Physics), Richard Adolf Zsigmondy (Chemistry) and George Bernard Shaw (Literature). There was no Prize for Medicine that year. The Peace Prize was not awarded at the time either; Austen Chamberlain of the United Kingdom and Charles G. Dawes of the United States were named retroactively twelve months later for their roles in the Locarno Treaties and the Dawes Plan, respectively.
The Chicago Cardinals football team beat the Milwaukee Badgers 59-0 in a game that resulted in the Chicago Cardinals–Milwaukee Badgers scandal, because the Badgers team was composed of high school players that the Cardinals could easily beat in order to pad their win–loss percentage and claim the NFL championship.

December 11, 1925 (Friday)
Pope Pius XI promulgated Quas primas, an encyclical introducing the Feast of Christ the King.
Born: Paul Greengard, neuroscientist and recipient of the Nobel Prize in Physiology or Medicine, in New York City (d. 2019)
Married: Karam and Kartari Chand were married in a Sikh ceremony in India, longest married living couple

December 12, 1925 (Saturday)
The Pottsville Maroons football team played an exhibition game against the Notre Dame Fighting Irish in Philadelphia, winning 9-7. This was the game that caused the 1925 NFL Championship controversy when National Football League President Joseph Carr immediately suspended the Maroons and denied them the rights to the championship on the grounds that they had violated the territorial rights of the Frankford Yellow Jackets.
The Chilean National Zoo opened.
The first motel in the world, the Milestone Mo-Tel (later the Motel Inn of San Luis Obispo), opened in San Luis Obispo, California.
Born: Ted Kennedy, hockey player, in Port Colborne, Ontario, Canada (d. 2009); Vladimir Shainsky, composer, in Kiev, Ukrainian SSR (d. 2017)

December 13, 1925 (Sunday)
Agent General for Reparations to Germany Seymour Parker Gilbert released his first annual report in Berlin, announcing that Germany was making rapid advances in its industrial and economic health and was fulfilling all its Dawes Plan commitments to the last detail.
Born: Dick Van Dyke, entertainer, in West Plains, Missouri
Died: Antonio Maura, 72, five-time Prime Minister of Spain

December 14, 1925 (Monday)
Pope Pius XI elevated four new cardinals: Bonaventura Cerretti, Enrico Gasparri, Irishman Patrick O'Donnell and Alessandro Verde. He also made a speech that did not specifically mention Mussolini or fascism by name but condemned "legislation which makes the state and not the church the center of social life."
The League of Nations settled the border between Greece and Bulgaria and fined the Greek government for the border violation committed during the Incident at Petrich.
Italy's Fascist government signs a secret pact with Britain aimed at reinforcing Italian dominance in Ethiopia.
Born: Sam Jones, baseball player, in Stewartsville, Ohio (d. 1971)

December 15, 1925 (Tuesday)
The War Ministry of Japan ordered 3,500 troops to Manchuria to protect the South Manchuria Railway and other Japanese interests around Mukden as the forces of Guo Songling advanced against Zhang Zuolin.
A League of Nations commission ruled on the Mosul Question by assigning most of the territory in the oil-rich Mosul region to Iraq, despite strong Turkish objections.
The third version of Madison Square Garden opened in New York City. The first official event was the New York Americans hockey team playing their first ever home game, losing 3-1 to the Montreal Canadiens.
Reza Khan became Rezā Shāh Pahlavi, the new Shah of Iran.
The film The Plastic Age opened.
Died: Battling Siki, 28, American-Senegalese boxer (shot)

December 16, 1925 (Wednesday)
The Italianization of South Tyrol became a contentious subject between Italy and Germany as a newspaper run by Gustav Stresemann ran an editorial protesting an Italian decree banning Christmas trees. "Have the most influential of the Italian politicians been abandoned by their God or their common sense, or have they without exception gone mad with their Fascist megalomania. For this newest deed can only be described as that of a crazy person", the editorial declared.  
The werewolf film Wolf Blood was released.

December 17, 1925 (Thursday)
The court-martial of Col. Billy Mitchell ended when he was convicted on all eight charges of insubordination. Mitchell was suspended without pay for five years, a verdict the court ruled was "lenient because of the military record of the accused during the world war."
The Siege of Jeddah ended in victory for Ibn Saud.
Turkey and the Soviet Union signed a security pact.
Natacha Rambova filed for divorce from Rudolph Valentino in Paris court.

December 18, 1925 (Friday)
The 14th Congress of the All-Union Communist Party (Bolsheviks) opened in Moscow.
António Maria da Silva became Prime Minister of Portugal for the fourth time.
Died: Hamo Thornycroft, 75, British sculptor

December 19, 1925 (Saturday)
Reichstag President Paul Löbe spoke out in favour of partial prohibition in Germany.
Ali of Hejaz abdicated the throne of Hejaz.
Born: Rabah Bitat, politician, in Aïn Kerma, Algeria (d. 2000); Robert B. Sherman, songwriter, in New York City (d. 2012)
Died: José Ignacio Quintón, Spanish pianist, 44

December 20, 1925 (Sunday)
The Western film Tumbleweeds was released.

December 21, 1925 (Monday)
The Sergei Eisenstein film Battleship Potemkin was released in the Soviet Union.
A Soviet decree announced that December 25 and 26 would be "days of rest" throughout Russia, although no mention of Christmas was made. Soviet efforts to make its citizens go to work on Christmas had been unpopular in previous years.
Born: Dorothy Kamenshek, baseball player, in Norwood, Ohio (d. 2010); Bob Rush, baseball player, in Battle Creek, Michigan (d. 2011)
Died: Lottie Lyell, 35, Australian female pioneer filmmaker (tuberculosis); Jules Méline, 87, 65th Prime Minister of France

December 22, 1925 (Tuesday)
The film A Kiss for Cinderella was released.
Died: Alice, Princess Dowager of Monaco, 67, consort of Albert of Monaco; Mary Thurman, 30, American film actress (pneumonia)

December 23, 1925 (Wednesday)
The Saudi conquest of Hejaz was completed when the Kingdom of Hejaz surrendered to Ibn Saud.
Born: Duncan Hallas, communist activist, in Manchester, England (d. 2002)

December 24, 1925 (Thursday)
Pope Pius XI closed the holy door at St. Peter's Basilica as the Jubilee year drew to a close.
Died: Guo Songling, 41 or 42, Manchurian general, executed after capture

December 25, 1925 (Friday)
The American Geographic Society announced the recipients of medals for notable contributions to the field of geography. Lucien Gallois, Erich von Drygalski, Robert Bartlett and David L. Brainard were among the honorees.
Nomura Securities was founded in Japan, a separate section from Osaka Nomura Bank. (currently Resona Holdings)
Six chemical companies in Germany merged to form IG Farben.
Born: Ned Garver, baseball player, in Ney, Ohio; Dorothy Mueller, baseball player, in Cheviot, Ohio (d. 1985)
Died: Karl Abraham, 48, German psychoanalyst

December 26, 1925 (Saturday)
White Hand Gang leader Richard "Pegleg" Lonergan arrived at a Christmas party in a Brooklyn speakeasy with five of his men around 3 a.m., intoxicated and uttering various racial slurs. The lights went out, shots were fired and patrons ran out in a panic. When the lights came back on, Lonergan and two of his men lay dead. Al Capone was in the club while on a visit to New York and had arranged the hit at the request of Frankie Yale; the ambush further enhanced Capone's notoriety.   
The Communist Party of India was founded.
Died: Richard Lonergan, 25, Brooklyn mobster

December 27, 1925 (Sunday)
52 miners were killed in a mine explosion near Palaú, Mexico.
Príncipe Pío station opened in Madrid, Spain.

December 28, 1925 (Monday)
The George Gershwin musical Tip-Toes opened on Broadway.
Crown Prince Carol renounced his right to the throne of Romania over a scandalous affair.
A U.S. postage stamp bearing a portraiture of the late President Woodrow Wilson was issued.
Born: Hildegard Knef, actress, singer and writer, in Ulm, Germany (d. 2002); Milton Obote, 2nd President of Uganda, in Apac (d. 2005)
Died: Raymond P. Rodgers, 76, American admiral; Sergei Yesenin, 30, Russian poet – committed suicide after writing his final poem Goodbye my friend, goodbye (До свиданья, друг мой, до свиданья) in his own blood

December 29, 1925 (Tuesday)
Europe began to get hit with a series of major floods. Hungary and Romania were the first to be struck hard, where Cluj-Napoca and Debrecen were inundated and about 100 people drowned.
Born: Pete Dye, golf course designer, in Urbana, Ohio (d. 2020)
Died: Félix Vallotton, 60, Swiss painter

December 30, 1925 (Wednesday)
The historical epic film Ben-Hur was released.
Six died in the Netherlands amid torrential rains and flooding.
Born: Ian MacNaughton, actor, in Glasgow, Scotland (d. 2002)

December 31, 1925 (Thursday)
The first attempt at a worldwide New Year's celebration was made via international radio. The United States sent out musical entertainment and New Year's greetings from the consuls general of various foreign countries in New York. Evening listeners for participating stations across the United States heard a radio announcer in London say, "This is 2LO calling America and sending New Year's greetings. We have received word that the American stations are broadcasting this program and we hope that it is being relayed successfully."
Belgium was hit with its worst flooding since 1876.
The first Saint Silvester Road Race was run in Brazil.
Died: J. Gordon Edwards, 58, Canadian filmmaker

References

1925
1925-12
1925-12